Dehnow-e Pain or Deh-e Now-e Pain or Deh Now Pain or Deh Now-ye Pain may refer to:

Villages in Iran
 Deh-e Now-e Pain, Kiar
 Deh Now-ye Pain, Kuhrang
 Deh Now-e Pain, Fars
 Dehnow-e Pain, Hormozgan
 Dehnow-e Pain, Kerman
 Deh-e Now-e Pain, South Khorasan